The 21st Airship Group was a unit of the United States Army Air Corps.  It was last assigned to the 3d Wing at Scott Field, Illinois. It was originally activated under a different name in 1921, and disbanded on 27 May 1939.

A predecessor of the group served on the Western Front in France during World War I. For most of the period between the two World Wars, the group was the only active lighter-than-air headquarters in the United States Army Air Service and, later, the United States Army Air Corps.

History
The 2d Balloon Squadron, a predecessor of the group was activated during World War I and deployed to Western Front in France.  The squadron was credited with participating in the Meuse-Argonne offensive (8–17 October 1918). The unit was demobilized as the I Corps Balloon Group in December 1918.

The 1st Balloon Group was organized in the fall of 1921 to support the Air Service Balloon and Airship School at Brooks Field, San Antonio, Texas.  However, a series of mishaps in operating the hydrogen-filled craft led to the transfer of the school from Brooks to Scott Field, Illinois, on 26 June 1922. Lighter-than-air ships were used at Scott Field to research the capabilities of aerial photography, meteorology and conduct altitude experiments. In the late 1920s, the emphasis shifted from airships to balloons.  Airplanes began to dominate activities at Scott Field, and in the late 1930s, the lighter-than-air activities there came to an end.

Lineage

I Corps Balloon Group
 Organized as the 2d Balloon Squadron on 25 September 1917
 Redesignated Company A, Balloon Wing, First Army on 19 June 1918
 Redesignated I Corps Balloon Group on 8 October 1918
 Demobilized in December 1918.
 Reconstituted on 20 November 1936 and consolidated with the 21st Airship Group as the 21st Airship Group

21st Balloon Group
 Constituted in the Regular Army as the 1st Balloon Group on 13 September 1921
 Redesignated 1st Airship Group on 3 January 1922.
 Redesignated 21st Airship Group on 1 January 1923
 Consolidated on 20 November 1936 with the I Corps Balloon Group
 Redesignated as 21st Balloon Group on 1 June 1937.
 Disbanded on 27 May 1939

Assignments
 Undetermined, 15 September 1917
 1st Air Depot, AEF, 3 January 1918
 Balloon Wing, First Army, 19 June 1918
 I Corps, 8 October-8 December 1918
 Zone of the Interior, 13 September 1921
 Air Service Balloon and Airship School (later Air Corps Balloon and Airship School). 3 January 1922
 General Headquarters Reserve, 8 May 1929
 General Headquarters Air Force, 1 October 1933
 Sixth Corps Area, 12 August 1936
 3d Wing, 19 February – 1 June 1939

Components

 8th Airship Company 1921–1933
 9th Airship Company 1921–1933
 9th Airship Squadron 1933–1937
 12th Airship Company 1921–1933
 16th Airship Company 1921–1933
 19th Airship Squadron 1933–1937
 1st Balloon Company, 1918
 2d Balloon Company, 1918
 3d Balloon Company, 1918

 1st Balloon Squadron 1937–1939
 2d Balloon Squadron 1937–1939
 3d Balloon Squadron 1937–1939
 24th Airship Service Company 1921–1933
 24th Airship Service Squadron 1933–1937
 24th Service Squadron 1937–1939
 21st Photo Section 1922-1937

Stations
 Fort Omaha, Nebraska, 25 September 1917
 Garden City, Long Island New York, September 1917
 Camp de Souge, Orléanaise, France, 3 January 1918 – 5 April 1918
 Brouville, Lorraine, France, 15 April 1918
 La Ferté-sous-Jouarre, Lorraine, France, 19 June 1918 through August 1918
 Toul, Lorraine, France, by September 1918
 Saizerais, Lorraine, France, 19 September 1918
 Colombey-les-Belles Airdrome, Meuse-Argonne Sector, France, c 8 October–December 1918
 Brooks Field, Texas, 13 September 1921
 Scott Field, Illinois, 1 July 1922 – 1 June 1939

References

Bibliography

 

Military units and formations of the United States Army Air Corps
Military units and formations established in 1917